Thecadactylus solimoensis is a species of gecko described in 2007. It is often confused with T. rapicauda, the turnip-tailed gecko.

References

Geckos
Reptiles described in 2007
Lizards of South America
Reptiles of Bolivia
Reptiles of Brazil
Reptiles of Colombia
Reptiles of Ecuador
Reptiles of Peru